The Cattle tick, (Rhipicephalus annulatus), is a hard-bodied tick of the genus Rhipicephalus. It is also known as North American cattle tick, North American Texas fever tick, and Texas fever tick.

Distribution
It shows a cosmopolitan distribution in tropical and subtropical regions of the world. It is found in Eritrea, Albania, Algeria, Benin, Bulgaria, Burkina Faso, Cameroon, Central African Republic, Chad, Colombia, Congo, Cote D'Ivoire, Egypt, Ethiopia, Ghana, Greece, Guam, Guinea, India, Israel, Jordan, Liberia, Libya, Madagascar, Mali, Mexico, Morocco, Nigeria, Portugal, Sierra Leone, South Africa, Spain, Sri Lanka, Sudan, Togo, Tunisia, and Turkey.

Parasitism
It is an obligate ectoparasite of domestic mammals such as cattle, horse, sheep, dog. It is a potential vector of many babesiosis pathogens like Babesia bigemina, Babesia bovis, and Anaplasma marginale.

Lifecycle
It shows a one-host lifecycle, where all larva, nymphs and adults lives in one host. After eggs hatched, larva crawl in vegetation and blown away with wind. After stick on to a host, larva found in softer parts of the body and then becomes nymph and then to adult after two molts. After sexually matured and mating, female detaches from the host and lay eggs on vegetation. Female dies after ovipositing. Adult has a hexagonal shaped scutum. Male has adanal shields and accessory shields. Anal groove is absent in female, but minute in male.

Control
Babesiasis is one of the major cattle devastating diseases throughout the world. It reduce the meat production, and dairy products as well. Quarantine is the major method of controlling ticks. Sanitation and frequent check for ticks also taken place. Preparations of Nigella sativa are a good method to control ticks.

References

External links
Rhipicephalus annulatus Overview - Texas Fever Tick
BOOPHILUS CATTLE TICKS: biology, prevention and control. Boophilus microplus, Rhipicephalus microplus
Histoarchitecture of the Ovary of Rhipicephalus (Boophilus) annulatus during Pre- and Postengorgement Period
Identification and characterization of Rhipicephalus (Boophilus) microplus candidate protective antigens for the control of cattle tick infestations
Identification of four novel Rhipicephalus annulatus upregulated salivary gland proteins as candidate vaccines.
Distribution of Rhipicephalus (Boophilus) microplus and Rhipicephalus (Boophilus) annulatus (Acari: Ixodidae) infestations detected in the United States along the Texas/Mexico border.

Ticks
Cosmopolitan arthropods
Animals described in 1821
Ixodidae